The Essex Senior Football League is an English men's football league. It contains clubs from the Essex FA, Hertfordshire FA, London FA, Middlesex FA and the Amateur Football Alliance. It is a feeder league to Division One North of the Isthmian League and has a single division which sits at Step 5 (or Level 9) of the National League System.

Founder members
The Essex Senior League was formed in 1971 with nine founder members.  The finishing positions for the 1971–72 season were as follows:

Promotion and relegation
The Essex Senior League states that a club must finish in the top 3 to be considered for promotion to the Isthmian League Division One North. However the process is governed by the FA Leagues Committee who regulate relegations and promotions throughout the National League System. As of the 2014–15 season FA rules for Step 5 divisions such as the Essex Senior League stipulate that the champions should be offered the first chance of promotion. If the champions do not wish to be promoted or are not able to meet the entry requirements for promotion then the 2nd or 3rd placed team may be considered for promotion. Under normal circumstances, only one club can be promoted from a Step 5 league (e.g., the Essex Senior League) to a Step 4 league (e.g., the Isthmian League Division One).

In exchange for the promoted club, the Essex Senior League would typically receive a relegated club from a Step 4 league. Relegated clubs of Step 4 leagues are allocated an appropriate league based on their geographical locations. Thus the Essex Senior League is most likely to receive one of the relegated clubs from the Isthmian League Division One North.

There was no relegation from the Essex Senior League into a lower league since there was no Step 6 equivalent to the ESL until the 2017–18 season. Leagues including the Essex Olympian League (Step 7) sometimes acted as a feeder league to the Essex Senior League but promotion and relegation between the two leagues was not automatic. A Step 6 division for Essex and East Anglia was announced in October 2017 to solve the relegation problem. Since 2018–19, the Eastern Counties League controls this new division.

Champions, runners up and third place finishers

League winners records
5 times – Basildon United
3 times – Billericay Town, Bowers & Pitsea, Concord Rangers, Great Wakering Rovers, Heybridge Swifts, Witham Town
2 times – Brentwood Town, Brightlingsea United, Canvey Island, Enfield Town, Ford United, Romford, Saffron Walden Town 
1 time – AFC Hornchurch, Barking, Burnham Ramblers, Enfield 1893, Haringey Borough, Hullbridge Sports, Leyton, Maldon Town, Purfleet, Stansted, Southend Manor, Walthamstow

Essex Senior League Challenge Cup

The Essex Senior League Challenge Cup is a knock-out tournament competed for by teams in the Essex Senior Football League. Brentwood Town and Basildon United hold the record jointly for the most cup wins, each lifting the trophy four times (Brentwood Town in 1975–76, 1978–79, 1990–91, 2006–07, Basildon United in 1977–78, 1993–94, 1997–98, 2015–16).
As of the 2017–18 season the competition is referred to as the "Errington Challenge Cup" in recognition of the league's treasurer Margaret Errington who held the post for 26 years before dying in 2016.

Final results

League and Cup Double
On 14 occasions a team has won both the Essex Senior League and the Essex Senior League Challenge Cup in the same season.  They are:

1972–73 – Billericay Town
1977–78 – Basildon United
1982–83 – Heybridge Swifts
1987–88 – Purfleet
1992–93 – Canvey Island
1993–94 – Basildon United
1995–96 – Romford
1998–99 – Bowers United
1999–00 – Saffron Walden Town
2005–06 – AFC Hornchurch
2006–07 – Brentwood Town
2011–12 – Witham Town
2013–14 – Great Wakering Rovers
2017–18 – Great Wakering Rovers

Former members

AFC Hornchurch
Barkingside
Basildon United
Beaumont Athletic
Billericay Town
Bowers & Pitsea
Brentwood Town
Brightlingsea United
Burnham Ramblers
Bury Academy
Canvey Island
Chelmsford City reserves

Cockfosters
Coggeshall Town
Colchester United 'A'
Concord Rangers
East Ham United
East Thurrock United
Enfield Town
Eton Manor
FC Romania
Great Wakering Rovers
Hackney Wick
Hadley

Haringey Borough
Hashtag United
Heybridge Swifts
Hoddesdon Town
Hullbridge Sports
Leyton
Leyton Athletic
London APSA
Maldon Town
Pegasus Athletic
Purfleet
Southend United 'A'

Sporting Bengal United
St Margaretsbury
Stambridge
Tilbury
Tiptree United
Tower Hamlets
Waltham Abbey
Walthamstow
Witham Town
Wivenhoe Town
Woodford Town
Woodford Town reserves

Notable former Essex Senior League players
Several Essex Senior League players have also played for Football League or Premier League teams:

Jimmy Greaves – Played for Brentwood Town after playing for West Ham United, Tottenham Hotspur, AC Milan, Chelsea and England.
Alan Brazil – Played for Stambridge after Queens Park Rangers and other teams including Manchester United and Scotland.
Kerry Dixon – Played in the Essex Senior League for Basildon after playing for other teams including Chelsea and England.
Michael Kightly – left Basildon United to join Southend United circa 2003, playing for Burnley as of April 2016.
Dwight Gayle – left Stansted to play for Dagenham & Redbridge, Peterborough United and Crystal Palace.
Trevor Putney – left Brentwood to join Ipswich Town in 1980, also played for Norwich City, and Middlesbrough.
Stuart Wardley – left Saffron Walden Town to join Queens Park Rangers in 1999.
Steve Tilson – left Witham Town to join Southend United in 1989.
Gary Hart – left Stansted for £1,000 and a set of kit to join Brighton & Hove Albion in 1998.
Ben Barnett – left Southend Manor to briefly join Leyton Orient in 2000.
Ian Renshaw – left Basildon United to join Scarborough.
John Warner – left Burnham Ramblers to join Colchester United in 1988.
Scott Forbes – left Saffron Walden Town to join Southend United in 2000.

References

External links
FA Full-Time League Websites (Essex Senior Football League)

 
1971 establishments in England
9
Sports leagues established in 1971
Football in Essex